Four ships of the Royal Navy have been named HMS Louisa:

 was a 3-gun gunvessel, previously a hoy, purchased in 1794 and sold in 1798.
HMS Louisa was also a 3-gun vessel, separate from the above, purchased in 1798 and sold in 1799.
 was a tender in service in 1814 and sold in 1816.
 was a cutter purchased in 1834. She foundered in 1841.
 was an  wooden screw gunboat launched in 1855 and sold in 1867.

See also
HM 
HM

Citations

References

Royal Navy ship names